Enki is a god in Sumerian mythology.

Enki may also refer to:

 Enki Bilal (born 1951), comic book creator
 Enki Catena, crater chain on Ganymede
 Mantidactylus enki, species of frog
 Enki, a 2015 album by Melechesh